Pozo Amargo is a town of only 1 inhabitant (INE 2014), that belongs to the municipality of Puerto Serrano, situated in the province of Cádiz, Spain. The town is almost inside of the province of Seville, with only a small jut of land keeping it connected to Cádiz, Spain. It is located on the bank of the River, Guadaira. The name in Spanish means, the Bitter Well.

History 
It has been found that Pozo Amargo was populated since the Iron Age, because still it conserves a wall built by the Iberians during that period. It has never been an independent municipality and always has been dependent on Puerto Serrano.

Populated places in Andalusia